Wafa al Bass (Wafa al-Biss, b. 1984) is a Palestinian Arab resident of Gaza who was permitted to enter Israel for the purpose of being treated at an Israeli hospital in 2005. She wore a suicide bomb vest which she attempted to explode as she crossed into Israel via the Erez Crossing.

Al Bass had been given permission to enter Israel to receive hospital treatment for severe burns, which she then received. During one of her return visits, guards at the crossing became suspicious and discovered that under her traditional black robes she had strapped a 22-pound bomb to her leg. When questioned, she said that she hoped to explode the bomb after arriving at the hospital where she had been treated.

She was imprisoned for 12 years and released in the 2011 Gilad Shalit prisoner exchange.

Upon release from prison she immediately attained further notoriety by urging Gazans to "take another Shalit" every year until all convicted Arab terrorists held in Israeli prisons were freed. As schoolchildren gathered at her home in northern Gaza to welcome her home, she told them, "I hope you will walk the same path we took and God willing, we will see some of you as martyrs."

Video
NBC News video  
Fox News interview

References

Terrorist incidents in Israel in 2005
Suicide bombing in the Israeli–Palestinian conflict
Palestinian militants
Palestinian female criminals
Female suicide bombers
People from the Gaza Strip
1984 births
Living people
Suicide bombers in Israel